Antonio García-Trevijano Forte (18 July 1927 – 28 February 2018) was a Spanish republican lawyer, notary public, jurist, philosopher, art critic, author and political activist. Born in Alhama de Granada, he was a prominent figure in the opposition to the Francoist dictatorship.

Political activism
In 1974 García-Trevijano organised meetings in Paris between Don Juan de Borbón and the republican groups plus the publishing group Ruedo Ibérico, in which the legitimate heir to the Spanish throne expressed his rejection of Franco's decree appointing his son Juan Carlos as his successor. He acted as a promoter of political freedom throughout Spain and was the leader of the Citizens' Movement towards the Constitutional Republic of Spain (MCRC).

Repression
He was tried for high treason before the Court of Public Order (Marshal of Ghent) because of his intervention in Equatorial Guinea; he was integral in helping put the dictator Francisco Macías Nguema in power. He has had five passports withdrawn, suffered three arrests and two fines, was the victim of a serious attack for his declarations to the BBC when Franco was dying, and was prosecuted by the Public Order Court (Gómez Chaparro) for an offense against the State and imprisoned for four months by order of Manuel Fraga Iribarne.

Bibliography
García-Trevijano wrote a blog and in the Journal of the Constitutional Republic.  A political analyst in the Spanish press, he wrote more than 50 articles in the Reporter magazine, over a thousand articles in ABC, El País, El Independiente, El Mundo, and La Razón. He has written several monographs in private law, a short book titled The Truth of my Intervention in Guinea.  He has also written the books The Democratic Alternative, The Discourse of the Republic, Confronting the Big Lie—which has been published in English with the title  A Pure Theory of Democracy by the University Press of America, Passions of servitude, an art book titled Donatello, Sculptor of the Childhood, and a book on philosophy of art entitled From Modernity to Modernism. Atheism Aesthetic: Art of the Twentieth Century. He has also written prologues to Palace of Injustice and El País: Culture as Business.

Personal life
García-Trevijano was Professor of Commercial Law at the University of Granada and a notary, and worked as an attorney in Madrid from 1960 until his death. He died on 28 February 2018 from natural causes. He was 90 years old.

Notes and references

  García-Trevijano Forte, Antonio. Pasiones de servidumbre. 2001. Madrid: Foca 
  García-Trevijano Forte, Antonio. Frente a la gran mentira. 1996. Madrid: Espasa Calpe. 
  García-Trevijano Forte, Antonio. "A pure theory of democracy"
  García Viñó, Manuel. El País: La cultura como negocio. 2006. Tafalla: Txalaparta. 
 Archivo Juan J. Linz sobre la transición española 
 "C.E. Camacho sale Trevijano se queda". 1976. Triunfo 697,11
 "Brutal atentado contra un grupo de profesionales". November 7, 1975. Informaciones.
 The Times Madrid correspondent. "Opposition to hold summit meeting in Madrid today". September 4, 1976. The Times, 3.
 Secretary of US State Kissinger. CONFIDENTIAL STATE 135254. EUROPEAN COMMUNITY AND SPAIN: OPPOSITION CAUSES CONTROVERSY. 10 June 1975.
 Martínez Reverte, Javier. Habla el conde de Barcelona. 22 de Enero 1974. Diario Pueblo.

See also
Felipe González
Henry Kissinger
Infante Juan, Count of Barcelona
Manuel Fraga Iribarne
Santiago Carrillo

External links
  Diario Español de la República Constitucional

Articles and audio-visual documents of Antonio García-Trevijano are available to read, listen and watch in the pro Justice & Democracy web Habeas-Corpus.net

1927 births
2018 deaths
People from Granada
Spanish atheists
Lawyers from Madrid
Spanish philosophers
Spanish republicans
Academic staff of the University of Granada
20th-century Spanish lawyers